Xenomigia cosanga is a moth of the family Notodontidae. It is found in north-eastern Ecuador.

The length of the forewings is 15-15.5 mm. The ground colour of the forewings is grey-brown with veins diffusely lined with light yellow scales. The hindwings are translucent white with a wide, contrasting grey-brown band along the outer margin.

Etymology
The species is named for the town of Cosanga in Ecuador.

References

Moths described in 2011
Notodontidae of South America